Nero was an unincorporated community in Hampshire County, West Virginia, United States. It is located on Back Creek Road (West Virginia Secondary Route 23/3) south of Lehew. Nero lies along Loman Branch, a tributary stream of the Cacapon River. Nero no longer has its own post office in operation.

References

Unincorporated communities in Hampshire County, West Virginia
Unincorporated communities in West Virginia